Park Wood is a  biological Site of Special Scientific Interest west of Chilham in Kent.

This wood is mainly hazel and hornbeam coppice with oak standards, and diverse shrub and ground layers. There are many breeding birds and invertebrates, including two which are rare, the wasp Crossocerus distinguendus and the soldier fly Stratiomys potamida.

There is access from the A252 road.

See also
 Down Bank SSSI across the valley
 Wye and Crundale Downs

References

Sites of Special Scientific Interest in Kent
Forests and woodlands of Kent